Nefamese or Arunamese is a pidgin of Arunachal Pradesh (formerly NEFA), India. Its classification is unclear; Ethnologue states that it is based on the Assamese language, but also that it is most closely related to the Sino-Tibetan Gallong like the Assamese language formed out by the mixture of languages like Austroasiatic, Tibeto-Burman, Tai and Indo-European family of languages. 

Nefamese emerged in eastern Arunachal Pradesh as a lingua franca among the Nyishi, Adi, Apatanai, Khampti, Hill Miri, Idu Mishimi, Nocte, Wancho, Tagin, Mompa, Zakhring, and Bugun peoples, among others—between them and with other Indigenous Assamese people and other Indigenous groups of Northeast India. The language is threatened by, and has perhaps somewhat been replaced by, the use of Hindi.

Phonology
Nefamese has six vowel phonemes, eighteen consonant phonemes and six diphthongs.

See also
 Nagamese Creole

References

References

 
 

Languages of Arunachal Pradesh
Assamese-based pidgins and creoles
Endangered pidgins and creoles
Endangered languages of India